Tahquitz Falls is a waterfall on Tahquitz Creek in the west skirt of the city Palm Springs, in the U.S. state of California. The waterfall is located in lower Tahquitz Canyon, a short distance upstream from the visitor center. The name of the canyon and its waterfall is from the spirit Tahquitz, a Cahuilla native of the Agua Caliente folklore.

The river flows over a slab of granite atop the falls, after which it plunges about  into a pool. The fall is split once by a protrusion on the face of the canyon wall. The Tahquitz Falls is in the boundaries included in the National Register of Historic Places.

Access
The falls are easily reached by proceeding upstream along the Tahquitz Canyon Trail. The canyon and its trail are owned and managed by the Agua Calientes Band of Cahuilla Indians.

In popular culture 
The Tahquitz Falls were used as a scene in Frank Capra's 1937 film, Lost Horizon.

See also 
 Tahquitz (spirit), the Cahuilla spirit the falls were named for.

References 

Waterfalls of California
Geography of Riverside County, California
Geography of the Colorado Desert
Palm Springs, California
Agua Caliente Band of Cahuilla Indians
Coachella Valley
Plunge waterfalls
San Jacinto Mountains